Servais is a surname of French origin, being the French version of the Latin name Servatius. The name refers to:

Adrien-François Servais (1807–1866), Belgian cellist and composer
Clément Servais (1862–1935), Belgian mathematician
Ed Servais, American college baseball coach
Émile Servais (1847–1928), Luxembourgian communist politician and revolutionary
Emmanuel Servais (1811–1890), Luxembourgian politician; Prime Minister of Luxembourg 1867–74
Franz Servais (1880–1966), Luxembourgian writer
Jean Servais (1910–1976), Belgian actor
Raoul Servais (b. 1928), Belgian film director
Scott Servais (b. 1967), American baseball player and coach

de:Servais
fr:Servais (homonymie)
nl:Servais